The 1954 World Table Tennis Championships men's doubles was the 21st edition of the men's doubles championship.
Žarko Dolinar and Vilim Harangozo won the title after defeating Viktor Barna and Michel Haguenauer in the final by three sets to nil.

Results

See also
List of World Table Tennis Championships medalists

References

-